Siba is a town in Luocheng Mulao Autonomous County, Guangxi, China.

Administrative division
As of 2021, the town is divided into three communities and twenty-one villages: 
Siba Community
Xiali Community
Lining Community
Xinyin
Daxin
Siping
Simin
Si'ai
Deneng
Shimen
Longma
Shuangzhai
Dashan
Dimen
Gantang
Jihuan
Mianhua
Lisheng
Lile
Lijiang
Ma'an
Changchun
Xin'an
Datong

History
Silu Township was set up in 1925 during the Republic of China.

In 1952, it was renamed "Siba Township". Its name was changed to "Siba People's Commune" in August 1958. It reverted to its former name of "Siba Township" in October 1984. In 1992 it was upgraded to a town. In August 2005, Xiali Township was merged into the town.

Geography
The town is situated at the southwest of Luocheng Mulao Autonomous County, bordering Tianhe to the west, Yizhou District to the south, and Dongmen to the east and north.

Economy
The economy of the town is largest based on agriculture, including farming and pig-breeding. Significant crops include rice, corn, and soybean. Commercial crops include sugarcane, cassava, and tobacco.

Demographics

The 2019 census showed the town's population to be 56,986, an increase of 2.0% from the 2011 census.

Tourist attractions
The town is rich in cultural traditions. It is also the hometown for many celebrities. The Former Residence of Wei Yiping is a popular attraction in the town to commemorate Wei Yiping, a Communist martyr who died while crossing the Yangtze River in October 1945. The Birthplace of Liu Sanjie is a well known tourist spot, named after Liu Sanjie, a legendary figure of Zhuang people in Guangxi.

Transportation
The Provincial Highway S204 passes across the town.

References

Bibliography

 

Divisions of Luocheng Mulao Autonomous County